Maiestas oryzae (formerly Recilia oryzae) is a species of plant-sucking bug from the Cicadellidae family that can be found in Japan, Korea, Taiwan, Henan, province of China. and the far-eastern Russian maritime. Maiestas oryzae feeds on the leaves of plants, including rice plants.

It was formerly placed within Recilia, but a 2009 revision moved it to Maiestas.

References

Hemiptera of Asia
Insects described in 1902
Maiestas